Events from the year 1788 in Canada.

Incumbents 
 Monarch: George III

Governors 
 Governor of the Canadas: Guy Carleton, 1st Baron Dorchester
 Governor of New Brunswick: Thomas Carleton
 Governor of Nova Scotia: John Parr
 Commodore-Governor of Newfoundland: John Elliot
 Governor of St. John's Island: Edmund Fanning

Events 
 Attorney-General Monk and Solicitor-General Williams are of opinion that, as the Jesuits have no civil existence as a Canadian corporation, their estates accrue to the Crown.
 Ontario is divided into five districts, under English law.

Births 
 January 1 – Peter Warren Dease, HBC officer and Arctic explorer (d.1863)
 October 14 – Sir Edward Sabine, soldier and scientist (d.1883)
 December 31 – Alexander Rankin, timber merchant, justice of the peace, politician, and office holder (d.1852)

References 

 
Canada
88